Amylibacter cionae is a Gram-negative, aerobic, rod-shaped and non-motile bacterium from the genus of Amylibacter which has been isolated from the sea squirt Ciona savignyi from Jiaozhou Bay in China.

References

External links
Type strain of Amylibacter cionae at BacDive -  the Bacterial Diversity Metadatabase

Rhodobacteraceae
Bacteria described in 2017